The defence industry sector of India is a strategically important sector in India. India has one of the world's largest military forces with a strength of over 14.4 lakh (1.44 million) active personnel. It has the world's largest volunteer military of over 51 lakh (5.1 million) personnel. It has the third largest annual defence budget behind USA (US$732 b) and China (US$261 b). It is the second largest defence importer behind Saudi Arabia making up 9.2% of global arms import. India has a domestic defence industry of which 80%  is government owned. The public sector includes DRDO and its 50 labs, 4 defence shipyards, 12 defence PSUs. India has a new defence procurement, acquisition and manufacturing policy to reduce imports and enhance domestic manufacturing.

"Defence Production Policy of 2018" (DPrP-2018) has a goal of becoming among the top 5 global producers of the aerospace and defence manufacturing with annual export target of US$5 billion by 2025. 12% of worldwide arms exports (by value) reach India. India domestically produces only 45% to 50% of defence products it uses, and the rest are imported. India's military–industrial complex has had little success and only recently private sector was allowed to enter the defence production. India's defence exports were ₹4,682 crore (US$0.66 billion) in 2017–2018 and ₹10,500 crore (US$1.47 billion) in 2018–2019, of 2018–2019 exports India's 8 Defence Public Sector Undertakings (DPSU) and 41 Ordnance Factories (OF) contributed ₹800 crore (7.6% of total defence exports). During 2014-2018 India was the world's second largest defence importer.

Military budget 
The military budget of India is about 1.49% for year 2018–19 of the total GDP. However, it spends nearly an equal amount in importing arms from other countries.

Its defence expenditure for the 2017–18 fiscal year, based on allotments by its Ministry of Finance was 86,488 crores for defence capital and 2,96,000 crores for defence pensions.

Service/ department-wise allocation as a percentage of total defence estimates in 2017–18:
Army: 55.9%
Air Force: 22.5%
Navy: 14.6%
DRDO: 5.7%
DGOF: 0.8%
DGQA: 0.5%
The Indian Army accounts for more than half of the total defence budget of India, with most of expenditure going to the maintenance of cantonments, salaries and pensions, instead of critical arms and ammunition. As of 2019, there is 25% shortfall in the military's budget demand versus the actually budget allocation by the government. There are suggestion to use the military's land bank to generate more funds to bridge this gap for the modernisation of military with the latest equipment. From November 2019, government exempted the imported defence equipment from the customs and import duties for a period of five year during which domestic production is unlikely to meet the technical demand of the forces. This will result in a savings of ₹25,000 crore (US$3.5 billion) which could be used for the modernisation of the forces.

State orders 

The Government of India has been pushing for greater indigenisation of military hardware as India imports a considerable amount of its defence equipment and platforms. Between 2016-2020, India  accounted for 9.5% of total global arms imports. From 2000-2022, Russia, France, Israel, the United States and United Kingdom are the top 5 countries where India imports its arms from. Thus in 2022, the Indian Government scrapped the import of several large defence platforms and equipment, which included helicopters for the Coast Guard, all-terrain vehicles (ATVs) and short range missiles. In addition to this, the Ministry of Defence has started releasing indigenisation lists, which consists of equipment and platforms that the government aims to completely indigenise by December 2025. The Defence Ministry has also stated that the equipment and platforms that are on the third indigenisation list, could result in state orders that are worth more than Rs 2,10,000 crore being placed on the Indian defence industry in the next five years.

Compared to other branches of military, the Indian Army consumes 50% of defence budget, is least technology intensive and slowest to adopt the indigenisation of equipment, has multi-year long procurement cycle, and pre-purchase field trials last for several years sometimes without resulting in any procurement, for example soldier's hand held GPS enabled indigenous "Sathi" PDA "Beta Project" was abandoned midway and soldiers still do not have a PDA. To expedite the development cycle of new technologies and to better fit the end user requirements, army has asked DRDO to take more army staff on deputation to be part of DRDO technology development project teams.

The Indian Armed forces are using numerous successful indigenous technologies produced by the DRDO, including Varunastra, Maareech, Ushus, Advanced Light Torpedo (TAL) Shyena; Electronic Warfare Technologies, radars, composite materials for LCA, AEW&C, Astra,  LCA Tejas by the Indian Airforce; ASAT, BrahMos, Nag missile, SAAW, Arjun MBT Mk 1A, 46 metre Modular Bridge, MPR, LLTR Ashwin by the army.

Arms Exports 

India's track record as an arms exporter has been modest due to export restrictions on the manufacturing organisations like OFB. OFB exports Arms and Ammunition, Weapon Spares, Chemicals & Explosives, Parachutes, Leather and Clothing items to more than 30 countries worldwide e.g. Thailand, Malaysia, Indonesia, Sri Lanka, Bangladesh, Germany, Belgium, Turkey, Egypt, Oman, Israel, Kenya, Nigeria, Botswana, Chile, Suriname and United States.

However, due to liberal policies adopted by the Prime Minister Narendra Modi's government since 2014, there has been a substantial increase in India's defence exports. According to the latest official data given in the upper house of Indian Parliament - the Rajya Sabha, India's defence export has jumped by 700% in just two years. The export authorisation went up from $213 million in FY 2016–17 to $1.5 billion in FY 2018-19 (April to March period). The Stockholm International Peace Research Institute has noted that three Indian companies that rank among the top-100 defence companies, viz., Hindustan Aeronautics Limited, AVANI and Bharat Electronics Limited, account for 1.2% of the defence exports of the top-100 total.

In March 2011 New Delhi agreed to sell its first indigenously designed and built multi-role offshore patrol vessel (OPV) named Barracuda, to Mauritius. In March 2017, India finalised a deal with Myanmar for sale of indigenously developed lightweight torpedoes worth US$37.9 million. Similar naval platforms were sold to Sri Lanka and Vietnam as well.

In Aug 2019, AWE received a second order from UAE to supply another 50,000 artillery shells.

The Defence Minister Rajnath Singh has stated in 2021 that India was ready to export different types of missile systems, Light Combat Aircraft, helicopters, multi-purpose light transport aircraft, warships and patrol vessels, artillery gun systems, tanks, radars, military vehicles, electronic warfare systems and other weapons systems to Indian Ocean region nations.

Companies

State-Run

New State Run 
 Munitions India Limited (MIL)
 Armoured Vehicles Nigam Limited (AVANI)
 Advanced Weapons and Equipment India Limited (AWE)
 Troop Comforts Limited (TCL)
 Yantra India Limited (YIL)
 India Optel Limited (IOL)
 Gliders India Limited (GIL)

Private companies 

Following have been given defence manufacturing license (please help expand this partial list):

 Adani Aero Defense Systems & Technologies
 Ashok Leyland Defence Systems
 Alpha Design Technologies
  Astra Microwave Products 
 Apollo Micro Systems
 BrahMos Aerospace
 Bharat Forge 
 Centum Electronics
 CRON Systems
 Crown Group 
 Data Patterns (India) Ltd
 DCX Systems 
 Dynamatic Technologies
 EyeROV
 Godrej & Boyce
 HBL Power Systems
 PTC Industries
Reliance Naval Shipyard  in partnership with MDL.
 Kalyani Group is developing  the DRDO Advanced Towed Artillery Gun System (ATAGS). 
 Kineco Limited
 Krishna Defence & Allied
 Larsen & Toubro  - L&T's defence solutions encompass land-based weapon systems, air defence and artillery systems and upgrades, naval weapon launch systems with fire-control systems, combat engineering systems, communication, avionics, C4I and missile systems. L&T designs and builds critical aerospace components, tracking and launch systems for space missions as well as for the Armed Forces.
 Tata Defence Systems
 Texmaco Defence Systems
 Titagarh Wagons
 Tonbo Imaging
 Triveni Engineering & Industries Limited
 SSS Defence 
 Mahindra Aerospace
 Mahindra Defence Systems Ltd.
 MKU
 MTAR Technologies
 Raphe Mphibr Pvt Ltd
 Punj Lloyd
 Samtel Avionics
 Sandeep Metalcraft Pvt Ltd
 Sika Interplant Systems Ltd.
 Solar Industries India
 Torus Robotics
 Vinveli
 ideaForge
 Optimized Electrotech

Other related
 ISRO, for aerospace manufacturer
 MTAR Technologies, rocket component manufacturer for ISRO
 NewSpace India Limited for low cost Rocket manufacturing

Domestic defence manufacturing

Indigenisation
In September 2019, DRDO formulated the "DRDO Policy and Procedures for Transfer of Technology" and released information on "DRDO-Industry Partnership: Synergy and Growth and DRDO Products with Potential for Export". During the Vibrant Goa Global Expo and Summit 2019 in October, DRDO signed technology transfer contracts with 16 Indian companies, including 3 startups, to produce products for the use by Indian Armed Forces. This included high shelf life, high nutrition, ready-to-eat on-the-go food products to be consumed in the difficult terrain and bad weather. To boost the domestic defence production capability, Defence Minister Rajnath Singh's November 2019 delegation included 50 Indian companies scouting for the Russian partners and joint ventures for the defence production in India. DRDO and ISRO have agreed to collaborate in India's  crewed orbital spacecraft project called Gaganyaan during which DRDOs various laboratories will tailor their defence capabilities to suit the needs of ISRO's human space mission. To become technology research and production leader, reduce reliance on the imports and increase self-reliance, DRDO Chief called for more collaboration with the industry, private sector, research and education institutes including IITs and NITs.

Make in India

The Modi government in its first year cleared 39 capital procurement proposals, of which 32 proposals worth  (or 96% of value of total proposals) were categorized as Buy (Indian) and Buy and Make (Indian)—the top two prioritized domestic industry-centric procurement categories as per the defence procurement procedure (DPP).

The government's policies to encourage domestic manufacturing and export of defence equipment under Prime Minister Narendra Modi's flagship scheme Make in India in Defence. It has already resulted in substantial growth of defence export from the country as it jumped by 700% in just two years, from $213 million in FY 2016–17 to $1.5 billion in FY 2018–19. Encouraged by this, the government set a target of achieving defence export worth ₹35,000 crore ($4.87 billion) in next four years.

In July 2015, the defence ministry eased export regulations and stopped demanding multiple assurances on end-use from foreign governments even for sale of components by Indian entities.

Some critics say that instead of encouraging the manufacturing of equipment in India, the Modi government has given financial powers to the Armed forces to purchase equipment up to ₹500 crores without the consultation of the Ministry. This will further increase the types of weapons, their spares and components, cost of maintainability which will result in non-compatibility and standardisation problems in near future.

FDI in Defence
Even though Modi government has been trying hard to get FDI in defence sector by first raising the cap from 26% to 74% through automatic route and 100% through MoD's approval, whereby the investing foreign entity can have ownership up to 100% in the defence manufacturing, it has received a dismal response with a meagre investment of just ₹56 lacs (US$0.08 million) in 2014–15, ₹71 lac (US$0.10 million) in 2015–16, ₹7 lacs (US$0.01 million) in 2017–18 and ₹15 crores (US$2.18 million) during 2018–19.

Negative import list 
An import embargo on 101 defence items was announced on 9 August 2020. Over a period of five years, the items will be prohibited from being imported.
On 31 May 2021 GoI announced the ban on 108 items that were excluded from early list. This also includes roadmap of five years for the promotion of indigenous. The list was described as "2nd Positive List for indigenigsation" by the government.

These include weapon systems like artillery guns, assault rifles, corvettes, transport aircraft, light combat helicopters (LCHs) and even wheeled armoured fighting vehicles (AFVs).

Involvement of Arms dealers, arms agents and middlemen 
Despite the strategic and economic importance of the defence sector, there have been numerous scandals that have been linked to defence deals which involve the import of foreign arms by the Indian government. Many of these scandals, include allegations related to bribery and the alleged involvement of middlemen. These alleged middlemen are also termed as lobbyists, arms agents or arms dealers. Until the 1980s, agenting or lobbying on behalf of foreign defence companies was legal in India, however due to the political fallout from the Bofors Scandal, which happened in the 1980s, the Indian Government banned agents from being involved in defence deals. This was due to the emergence of allegations against certain Indian politicians and defence officials of receiving payoffs to clinch the deal the between Bofors and the Indian Government.

Despite the fact that arms dealers or arms agents are controversial within the defence sector, it has been reported that their role and involvement is critical for any defence deal to take place between foreign defence companies and the Indian Government. Allegedly, arms agents can manipulate the procurement process because they have the means to pay substantial commissions to politicians, military officials and bureaucrats, therefore making them ever-present in defence deals. In addition to this, members of the Ministry of Defence and military officials have stated that arms agents have the power to manipulate what is written in weapons test reports, and General V.K Singh, a former Indian Chief of the Army Staff, stated that the reach of lobbyists within the Defence Ministry extends to the level where agents have access to classified intelligence and know the inner workings of the ministry.

According to the Central Bureau of Investigation (CBI), Vipin Khanna, Sudhir Choudhrie and Suresh Nanda were the three largest and most powerful arms dealers. Allegedly, Khanna, Choudhrie and Nanda, started dominating the defence sector since before the Bofors Scandal in the 1980s, and their families have maintained their positions. Supposedly, their commissions from arms deals could be up to as high as 15%. Reportedly, Khanna, Choudhrie and Nanda played critical roles in getting defence deals approved because they have the capabilities to get a deal through the political and bureaucratic procurement process, due to their influence and connections within India. All three men and members of their families have been accused in several defence scandals, however none of the allegations against them have ever been proven.

Several other individuals have also been alleged or rumoured to be smaller arms dealers or arms agents. This includes Abhishek Verma, who reportedly portrayed himself to be a powerful arms dealer, but according to the CBI, Verma was merely pretending to be in that position and according to Verma's associates, who spoke anonymously to the Economic Times for their article, Verma had created a false image of both his business and his wealth. In 2012, Verma was arrested by the CBI for violating the Official Secrets Act, but in 2017, Verma was discharged by the courts due to lack of evidence against him. Another individual accused of being an arms dealer is Sanjay Bhandari, who fled to the United Kingdom in 2016, and is currently fighting an extradition case, as the Indian Government wants Bhandari extradited to India, to face charges of money laundering and tax evasion. The CBI also accused Mohinder Singh Sahni of being a small time arms dealer, during an investigation probe into him.

In addition to this, non-Indian citizens have also been accused for allegedly giving bribes and kickbacks to influence defence deals in India. This include Christian Michel, a British Citizen, who was extradited to India from the United Arab Emirates in 2018. Michel has been accused by the CBI and the Enforcement Directorate, for allegedly being one of the middlemen in the 2013 Indian helicopter bribery scandal, and has been in judicial custody in India for over two years, with his bail being denied by the Indian courts.

See also 
 Military–industrial complex
 Space industry of India
 Economy of India

References